The second competition weekend of the 2014–15 ISU Speed Skating World Cup was held in the Taereung International Ice Rink in Seoul, South Korea, from Friday, 21 November, until Sunday, 23 November 2014.

Continuing his success debut of the previous weekend, Pavel Kulizhnikov of Russia won both 500 m races, and the 1000 m race. Claudia Pechstein of Germany bettered her own record as the oldest winner of a World Cup race, to 42 years and 272 days, as she won the women's 5000 m.

Schedule
The detailed schedule of events:

All times are KST (UTC+9).

Medal summary

Men's events

 In mass start, race points are accumulated during the race. The skater with most race points is the winner.

Women's events

 In mass start, race points are accumulated during the race. The skater with most race points is the winner.

References

 
2
Isu World Cup, 2014-15, 2
Sport in Seoul